The knockout stage of 2022 AFC Women's Asian Cup began on 30 January 2022 with the quarter-finals and ended on 6 February 2022 with the final in Navi Mumbai, India.

Times listed are Indian Standard Time (UTC+5:30).

Format
In the knockout phase, if a match is level at the end of 90 minutes of normal playing time, extra time is played (two periods of 15 minutes each), where each team is allowed to make a fourth substitution. If still tied after extra time, the match is decided by a penalty shoot-out to determine the winners. From this tournament, there will be no third place play-off.

Qualified teams
The top two placed teams from each of the three groups, along with the two best-placed third teams, will qualify for the knockout stage.

Bracket

Quarter-finals
The winners qualified for the 2023 FIFA Women's World Cup, while the losers, with the exception of Australia, entered the play-offs.

China PR vs Vietnam

Australia vs South Korea

Japan vs Thailand

Chinese Taipei vs Philippines

Semi-finals

China PR vs Japan

South Korea vs Philippines

Final

Play-offs
The format of the play-offs round depended on the performance of Australia, who qualified automatically for the World Cup as hosts. Since Australia was eliminated in the quarter finals, the play-offs format was for the remaining three quarter-final losers to play a single round-robin play-off. The best team after three matches advanced to the World Cup, and the remaining two teams entered the inter-confederation play-offs.

Thailand vs Vietnam

Chinese Taipei vs Thailand

Vietnam vs Chinese Taipei

References

External links
, the-AFC.com

Knockout stage